Fore! is the fourth studio album by American rock band Huey Lewis and the News, released on August 20, 1986. The album was a commercial success, peaking at number one on the Billboard 200 and went on to score five top-ten Billboard Hot 100 singles, including the number-one hits, "Stuck with You" and "Jacob's Ladder". The album was certified three-times platinum by the Recording Industry Association of America.

Music and lyrics 
"Jacob's Ladder" was originally meant for a Bruce Hornsby album that Huey Lewis was producing. Hornsby did not like the arrangement his band played, and it was given to Lewis.

"Doing It All for My Baby" was written by Mike Duke and Phil Cody. Duke wrote the song and then recorded vocals himself (the band playing backing parts and instruments), with the intention of getting a record contract for his own solo career. When that plan fell through, Lewis decided to record a version with his own vocals for the album.

Lewis stated he originally wrote the lyrics for "Hip to Be Square" in a third person perspective, "He used to be a renegade...". He referenced the book Bobos in Paradise in describing the song's inspiration, explaining that the song was about the "phenomenon where people from the '60s started to drop back in, cut their hair, work out, that kind of crap, but they kept their bohemian tastes. ... bourgeois bohemians." Lewis later modified the lyrics to be in the first person as he believed it would enhance the joke, but stated this had unintentionally led to the interpretation of the song as an "anthem for square people".

According to Lewis, the album track "Forest for the Trees" was written for and about kids struggling with life issues as an uplifting message for them. Lewis based it off the letters he received from young fans at the time who would talk about how important his music was to them.

"The Power of Love", originally from the soundtrack of the 1985 film Back to the Future, is included as a bonus track on international editions of the album. The song was the band's first chart-topper on the Billboard Hot 100.

Album cover
The wall that Lewis and the members of the band stand against on the album's cover is a wall from Tamalpais High School in Mill Valley, California. Band members Bill Gibson, Sean Hopper and Mario Cipollina went to this school together.

In popular culture 
The album is referenced in the film American Psycho. The main character Patrick Bateman, while talking to one of his potential victims, gives a review of the album, discussing the band's viewpoint, intent, and how specifically the song "Hip to Be Square" espouses "the pleasures of conformity" but with a catchy 1980s beat, going on to state it is "the group's most accomplished album".

Track listing

Personnel 

Huey Lewis and the News
 Huey Lewis – harmonica, vocals
 Johnny Colla – guitar, saxophone, backing vocals
 Chris Hayes – guitar, backing vocals
 Mario Cipollina – bass
 Bill Gibson – percussion, drums, backing vocals
 Sean Hopper – keyboard, backing vocals

Additional personnel
 Tower of Power Horns (4, 10):
 Greg Adams – trumpet, horn arrangements
 Emilio Castillo – tenor saxophone
 Richard Elliot – tenor saxophone
 Stephen "Doc" Kupka – baritone saxophone (4, 5, 10), backing vocals (5, 6)
 Lee Thornburg – trumpet
 David Jenkins – backing vocals (1)
 Ralph Arista – backing vocals (5, 6)
 Dwight Clark – backing vocals (5, 6)
 Mike Duke – backing vocals (5, 6)
 Riki Ellison – backing vocals (5, 6)
 Jerome Fletcher – backing vocals (5, 6)
 Ronnie Lott – backing vocals (5, 6)
 Joe Montana – backing vocals (5, 6)
 Jim Moran – backing vocals (5, 6)

Production 
 Huey Lewis and the News – producers
 Jim Gaines – engineer
 Robert Missbach – engineer, mixing (1-8, 10)
 Michael Christopher – second engineer
 Phil Kaffel – additional engineer
 Malcolm Pollack – additional engineer, mixing (9)
 Rob Beaton – assistant engineer
 Alex Hass – assistant engineer
 Tom Size – assistant engineer
 Jim "Watts" Vereecke – assistant engineer
 Bob Clearmountain – mixing on "The Power of Love"
 Mixed at The Power Station (New York, NY).
 Bob Ludwig – mastering at Masterdisk (New York, NY).
 Ralph Arista – guitar technician
 Jerry Daniels – keyboard technician
 Terry Persons – production manager
 Anita Wong – production design
 Laura Lamar – graphic design
 Bennett Hall – art direction, illustration, photography

Charts

Weekly charts

Year-end charts

Certifications

References 

1986 albums
Huey Lewis and the News albums
Chrysalis Records albums